Rolling hills is a terrain of undulating gently sloped low hills.

Rolling Hills may also refer to:

Canada
 Rolling Hills, Alberta

United States
 Rolling Hills, California, in Los Angeles County
 Rolling Hills, Madera County, California
 Rolling Hills, Clark County, Indiana
 Rolling Hills, Kentucky
 Rolling Hills, Wyoming
 Rolling Hills Elementary School (Lancaster, Texas)
 Rolling Hills Estates, California
Rolling Hills Zoo, Kansas
Rolling Hills Memorial Park
Rolling Hills Christian Church
Rolling Hills Wind Farm

See also